Caenagnathoidea ("recent jaw forms") is a group of advanced oviraptorosaurian dinosaurs from the Cretaceous Period of what are now Asia and North America. They are distinct for their characteristically short, beaked, parrot-like skulls, often with bony crests atop the head. They ranged in size from Caudipteryx, which was the size of a turkey, to the 8 meter long, 1.4 ton Gigantoraptor. The group (along with all maniraptoran dinosaurs) is close to the ancestry of birds. The most complete specimens have been found in Asia, representing members of the sub-group Oviraptorinae. Notable but fragmentary remains are also known from North America, almost all of which belong to the subgroup Elmisaurinae.

The earliest definitive caenangnathoid is Microvenator celer, which dates to the late Aptian age of the early Cretaceous period, though the slightly earlier Caudipteryx from the lower Yixian Formation of China, may also be a member of this group.

Classification
The internal classification of the oviraptorosaurs has also been controversial. Most early studies divided them into two primary sub-groups, the Caenagnathidae and the Oviraptoridae. The Oviraptoridae was further divided into the small, short-armed, and crestless subfamily  Ingeniinae, and the larger, crested, long-armed Oviraptorinae. However, later phylogenetic studies showed that many traditional members of the Caenagnathidae were in fact more closely related to the crested oviraptorids. Because Caenagnathus itself is no longer considered part of this group, the subfamily is usually now termed the Elmisaurinae. The taxonomy here follows the one presented by Thomas Holtz, Jr. in 2010 unless otherwise noted.

The following cladogram follows an analysis by Phil Senter, 2007.

See also

 Timeline of oviraptorosaur research

References

 

Oviraptorosaurs